Rostellaria is a genus of sea snails, marine gastropod mollusks in the family Strombidae, the true conchs.

The genus Rostellaria has become a synonym of Tibia Röding, 1798

Species
Species brought into synonymy 
 Rostellaria brevirostris Schumacher, 1817 : synonym of Tibia insulaechorab Röding, 1798
 Rostellaria curta G.B. Sowerby II, 1842 : synonym of Tibia curta (G.B. Sowerby II, 1842)
 Rostellaria curvirostra Lamarck, 1816 : synonym of Tibia insulaechorab Röding, 1798
 Rostellaria delicatula G. Nevill, 1881 : synonym of Rostellariella delicatula (G. Nevill, 1881)
 Rostellaria dentula Perry, 1811 : synonym of Tibia insulaechorab Röding, 1798
 Rostellaria ionica Perry, 1811: synonym of Tibia fusus (Linnaeus, 1758)
 Rostellaria lorenzi Morrison, 2005: synonym of Rostellariella lorenzi Morrison, 2005
 Rostellaria magna Mörch, 1852 : synonym of Tibia insulaechorab Röding, 1798
 Rostellaria powisii Petit de la Saussaye, 1840 : synonym of Rimellopsis powisii (Petit de la Saussaye, 1840)
 Rostellaria rectirostris Lamarck, 1822 : synonym of Tibia fusus (Linnaeus, 1758)
 Rostellaria sinensis Perry, 1811 : synonym of Tibia fusus (Linnaeus, 1758)
 Rostellaria subulata Lamarck, 1801 : synonym of Tibia fusus (Linnaeus, 1758)

References

Strombidae